The 5th Landwehr Division (5. Landwehr-Division) was a unit of the Imperial German Army in World War I.  The division was formed in October 1914 as the Waldow Division (Division Waldow), named after its commander.  It was made up primarily of Landwehr soldiers from the garrison of Metz.  It became the 5th Landwehr Division in January 1915.   The division was disbanded in 1919 during the demobilization of the German Army after World War I.

Combat chronicle

The Waldow Division/5th Landwehr Division served on the Western Front.   It generally occupied the line between the Meuse and Moselle Rivers and around Verdun.  From February to July 1916, it participated in the Battle of Verdun.  In September 1918, it fought the Americans and French in the Battle of Saint-Mihiel.  Allied intelligence rated the division as fourth class; it was considered primarily a sector holding division and not an offensive formation.

Order of battle on formation

The Waldow Division/5th Landwehr Division was formed as a square division.  The order of battle of the division on October 25, 1914, was as follows:

14.Landwehr-Infanterie-Brigade
Landwehr-Infanterie-Regiment Nr. 17
Landwehr-Infanterie-Regiment Nr. 36
Landwehr-Infanterie-Regiment Nr. 66
Reserve-Festungs-MG-Abteilung Nr. 1
Reserve-Festungs-MG-Abteilung Nr. 3
Festungs-MG-Abteilung Nr. 14
30.Landwehr-Infanterie-Brigade
Landwehr-Infanterie-Regiment Nr. 25
Landwehr-Infanterie-Regiment Nr. 65
Reserve-Festungs-MG-Abteilung Nr. 6
Festungs-MG-Trupp Nr. 10
Festungs-MG-Trupp Nr. 12
1/2 Eskadron/Reserve-Husaren-Regiment Nr. 2
Landwehr-Fußartillerie-Bataillon Nr. 8
Ersatz-Bataillon/Kgl. Bayerisches 2. Fußartillerie-Regiment
1. mobil Landwehr-Pionier-Kompanie/XVI. Armeekorps
1. mobil Landwehr-Pionier-Kompanie/XI. Armeekorps

Late-war order of battle

The division underwent a number of organizational changes over the course of the war.  It was triangularized in April 1917.  A signals command was formed and combat engineer support was expanded to a full battalion.  The order of battle on January 4, 1918, was as follows:

30.Landwehr-Infanterie-Brigade
Landwehr-Infanterie-Regiment Nr. 25
Landwehr-Infanterie-Regiment Nr. 36
Landwehr-Infanterie-Regiment Nr. 65
2.Eskadron/Ulanen-Regiment Hennigs von Treffenfeld (Altmärkisches) Nr. 16
Landwehr-Feldartillerie-Regiment Nr. 256
Stab Pionier-Bataillon Nr. 405
1.Landwehr-Pionier-Kompanie/XI. Armeekorps
1.Landwehr-Pionier-Kompanie/XVI. Armeekorps
Minenwerfer-Kompanie Nr. 305
Divisions-Nachrichten-Kommandeur 505

References
 Division-Waldow (Chronik 1914/1915) - Der erste Weltkrieg
 05.Landwehr-Division (Chronik 1915/1919) - Der erste Weltkrieg
 Hermann Cron et al., Ruhmeshalle unserer alten Armee (Berlin, 1935)
 Hermann Cron, Geschichte des deutschen Heeres im Weltkriege 1914-1918 (Berlin, 1937)
 Günter Wegner, Stellenbesetzung der deutschen Heere 1825-1939. (Biblio Verlag, Osnabrück, 1993), Bd. 1
 Histories of Two Hundred and Fifty-One Divisions of the German Army which Participated in the War (1914-1918), compiled from records of Intelligence section of the General Staff, American Expeditionary Forces, at General Headquarters, Chaumont, France 1919 (1920)

Notes

Infantry divisions of Germany in World War I
Military units and formations established in 1914
Military units and formations disestablished in 1919
1914 establishments in Germany